Stephen Marmion Lowe (born 3 August 1962) is a New Zealand prelate of the Roman Catholic Church. On 18 December 2021, Pope Francis appointed him as the twelfth Bishop of Auckland, succeeding Bishop Patrick Dunn. From 2015 until his Auckland appointment, he was the Bishop of Hamilton, New Zealand.

Early life and education
Lowe was born in Hokitika, the youngest child of Milly and Frank Lowe, with two older sisters Margaret and Dorothy. He was educated at Hokitika Primary School, then St Mary's Primary School, Hokitika. He undertook his secondary studies at Westland High School.

Following school he worked for the NZ Forest Service in Hokitika and Christchurch and the NZ Timberlands in Timaru. During this time he became involved in his local parish in Timaru North where he was involved in a young adults group and with youth in the parish. In 1989 he discerned the call to priesthood. He attended Holy Cross College in Mosgiel and then the St Charles Borromeo Seminary, Philadelphia, Pennsylvania (United States).

Ordained ministry
Lowe was ordained a priest on 7 June 1996, in Hokitika for the Diocese of Christchurch and served as the assistant priest in Mairehau, Ashburton and Greymouth parishes before being appointed parish priest of Timaru North and Chaplain of Roncalli College in 2000. During the years 2005–2007 he completed a Licenciate in Spiritual Theology in Rome at the Pontifical Gregorian University.

From 2008 until October 2014, Lowe was the director of formation at the National Seminary, Holy Cross College in Ponsonby, Auckland. While based at the seminary in Auckland, he served, for a time, as Parish Priest of Ponsonby.

Episcopal ministry – Hamilton
On 22 November 2014, Lowe was appointed by Pope Francis to replace Denis Browne, the 2nd Bishop of Hamiton, whose resignation was accepted on the same date. His consecration as a bishop took place at the Cathedral of the Blessed Virgin Mary, Hamilton, on 13 February 2015. His principal consecrator was his predecessor, Denis Browne. The principal co-consecrators were Bishop Barry Jones of Christchurch and Bishop Charles Drennan of Palmerston North. 

In 2021, Lowe was the Vice President and Secretary of the NZ Catholic Bishops Conference, and the bishops’ representative on Te Rūnanga o te Hāhi Katorika ō Aotearoa, the Church’s national Māori advisory group. He was also a member of several other bodies including the National Safeguarding and Professional Standards Committee.

Bishop of Auckland
Lowe was appointed as the twelfth Bishop of Auckland on 17 December 2021, and installed on Saturday 19 February 2022.

References

External links
 Hamilton Catholic Diocese
 "Bishop Stephen Marmion Lowe", Catholic Hierarchy

1962 births
People from Hokitika
Living people
Pontifical Gregorian University alumni
Holy Cross College, New Zealand alumni
21st-century Roman Catholic bishops in New Zealand
People educated at Westland High School, Hokitika
Roman Catholic bishops of Hamilton, New Zealand